"Better in Time" is a song recorded by English singer Leona Lewis for her debut studio album Spirit (2007). It was written by J. R. Rotem and Andrea Martin and was produced by Rotem. Lyrically, the song tells the story of a woman who cannot forget her ex-partner, and who knows that "it will all get better in time". It was released as the second single from Spirit on 10 March 2008, as a double A-side with "Footprints in the Sand", by Syco Music and J Records.

Critically acclaimed, "Better in Time" was nominated for the Brit Award for British Single. It peaked at number two on the UK Singles Chart, reaching the top ten in Australia, Canada, Germany, Ireland, Italy and New Zealand. Lewis promoted the song on several live television programmes, such as Good Morning America, Live with Regis and Kelly, and on the 2008 American Music Awards, also being included on the set list of her debut concert tour The Labyrinth (2010). The song's accompanying music video was directed by Sophie Muller at the Hampton Court House School in London in February 2008, and shows Lewis performing in front of several photographic set-ups and events behind the scenes.

Composition and release

"Better in Time" is a pop and R&B song set in common time composed in a moderate tempo of eighty beats per minute, in the key of G flat major with a vocal range from the tone of C4 to the note of B5. The song has a sequence of G–Bm–Em–G/D–C as its chord progression. Lyrically the song talks about someone who cannot forget her ex-partner, and at the end the protagonist knows that "it will all get better in time". Andrea Martin and J. R. Rotem wrote the song, and Rotem composed and produced it. On 29 January 2008, Lewis announced on her website that "Better in Time", along with "Footprints in the Sand", would be released as a double A-side single on 10 March 2008, as her third single in the United Kingdom, with 2008 Sport Relief, a biennial charity organised by Comic Relief and BBC Sport, selecting "Footprints in the Sand" as their official single. It was also her second international single. A new remix of the song was created for the single release. The double A-side was released with another song, "You Bring Me Down", as a B-side.

Critical reception

"Better in Time" received generally positive reviews from music critics. In his review of the album, Chung Ah-young of The Korea Times described the single as "one of the best tracks [on the album] with impressive piano sounds harmonized with [Lewis] powerful vocals". Alex Fletcher from Digital Spy gave a mixed review to the double A-side. He called the single a "placid affair" with "its plinky-plonky piano and R&B groove resting uncomfortably next to Lewis's creamy vocal style". The BBC's reviewer Fraser McAlpine gave "Better in Time" three stars out of five commenting that "The tune's quite nice, fairly hummable without ever actually going anywhere and despite the floaty, Mariah-esque qualities of Leona's vocals, it never goes completely mental in the throat-breakdancing department".

Chuck Taylor of Billboard gave a positive review, stating that the song is of "equal caliber to its predecessor ["Bleeding Love"], with a one-listen hook, elegant chug-along melody, a lyric about healing and Lewis' unquestionably emotive vocal versatility". Sarah Rodman of The Boston Globe called it a "love takes time' rumination", and along with another song of the album ("I Will Be"), described it as "predictable". Sean Fennessey for Vibe noted that the track "is the best thing [on the album], is mannered and takes nearly three minutes to get off the ground". It ranked at number four on the "10 Best Singles of 2008" list by American magazine Entertainment Weekly. "Better in Time" was nominated at the 2009 BRIT Awards in the category of Best British Single, and later the song was included on the awards' compilation album.

Chart performance

The double A-side "Better in Time" and "Footprints in the Sand" debuted at number 74 on the UK Singles Chart on 1 March 2008; rising 36 places, it debuted in the top 40 the following week, at number 38. On its fourth week, the song reached its peak position at number two, selling 40,476 copies and being beaten to the number one spot by Duffy's "Mercy". With this it became the third single by Lewis to reach the top five in the country. "Better in Time" and "Footprints in the Sand" was certified as silver by the British Phonographic Industry (BPI). In the Australian charts, "Better in Time" debuted at number 32 on 27 April 2008, reaching the top ten two weeks later, her second single to achieve this feat. On 25 May 2008 the single reached its peak position, at number six, and remained within the top fifty for eighteen weeks. The song was later certified gold by the Australian Recording Industry Association (ARIA). It debuted at number 34 on New Zealand's RIANZ Chart on 17 March 2008, eventually reaching number nine after five weeks, and by its seventh week had climbed to number six, thereby becoming her second consecutive top ten hit in the country. "Better in Time" and "Footprints in the Sand" debuted in the German charts on 16 June 2008 at number five. Although it fell out the top ten the following week, it managed to reach the top five in the issue ending 27 July 2010, and rose to its peak position, at number two, in subsequent days. "Better in Time" entered the German chart on 22 February 2009 at number seventy-nine, where it stayed for three weeks. It achieved a gold certification by the Bundesverband Musikindustrie (BVMI). In Denmark "Better in Time" entered the charts at number twenty-nine on 9 May 2008, and managed to rise twenty-three places in the next two weeks. On 6 June 2008 the single reached its peak position, number three. Next week, it fell out two places, but it retook its peak the following issue, and the song continued in this position for three weeks. 

"Better in Time" and "Footprints in the Sand" debuted and peaked at number eight on the European Hot 100 Singles in the issue ending 29 March 2008, becoming the highest debut of the week. Moreover, "Better in Time" was also a success in the chart, the single eventually reached number seven on the chart in the week ending 2 August 2008. In Switzerland, the single entered at number thirteen, becoming the highest release of the week. On 27 July 2008, its ninth week, it reached its peak position at number five, becoming Lewis's second top five in the country. It managed to stay within the top ten for eleven weeks and it was last seen in the chart on 22 March 2009, forty-two weeks after its debut. In the week ending 26 April 2008, "Better in Time" debuted at number sixty-two on the Billboard Hot 100, in the same week that her previous single, "Bleeding Love", topped the chart. Next week it dropped out of the chart but later re-entered the Hot 100 at number seventy-five, becoming the best comeback of the week. The song reached its peak position at number eleven on its fourteenth week, where it stayed for another week. In other charts of the United States, "Better in Time" peaked at number four on the Adult Top 40, ninety-nine on the Hot R&B/Hip-Hop Songs, three at the Mainstream Top 40, and at number four on the Adult Contemporary chart, where it spent fifty-two weeks on the chart. The single became the seventeenth best-selling single of 2008 in Austria, as well as the twenty-second in Germany and Switzerland, the thirty-sixth in New Zealand, the thirty-seventh in the UK, the fifty-fifth of Australia, the sixty-fourth in the Netherlands, and the seventy-second in Flanders, a region in Belgium.

Music video and promotion

The music video was filmed at Hampton Court House School in London by the British director Sophie Muller in February 2008, and was released at the end of the same month. The video is inspired by fashion design, with Lewis performing in front of "unrelated photographic set-ups", and shows what goes on behind the scenes. In some parts of the video Lewis is shown with a horse.

Lewis first performed the song live on the television programme Dancing on Ice on 9 March 2008. Lewis also performed both sides of the single on BBC One's Sport Relief on 14 March 2008, Good Morning America on 4 April 2008, and on the Jimmy Kimmel Live! show along with "Bleeding Love". On 3 September 2008 Lewis performed the song on Live with Regis and Kelly, and on 1 October 2008 on the season finale of America's Got Talent. The song was featured in the 90210 episode "Lucky Strike", originally aired on 9 September 2008. On 24 November 2008, Lewis performed the song at the 2008 American Music Awards. In May 2010, the song was added to the setlist of her The Labyrinth tour, performed as the fourth song of the show. "Better in Time" was included on the tour's live album and Blu-ray The Labyrinth Tour Live from The O2, released on 29 November 2010. In 2011, Lewis performed a reggae version of the song at BBC Radio 1 segment Live Lounge, where she mashed up the single with "Man Down", a song by Rihanna. It is also one of thirty-eight songs included on the benefit album Songs for Japan, a compilation album released in response to the aftermath of the 2011 earthquake and tsunami in Tōhoku, Japan), released on 25 March 2011. "Better in Time" was used in the American television series Pretty Little Liars, for the second season finale "unmAsked", in the masquerade ball scene. In 2013, Lewis performed the song along with "Man Down" during her Glassheart Tour.

Track listings and formats

Australian Maxi single and UK Sport Relief CD single
"Better in Time" – 3:55
"Footprints in the Sand" – 4:09
"You Bring Me Down" – 3:54

CD single (Syco), CD single (RCA), Maxi single, and Swiss CD single
"Better in Time" (Single Mix) – 3:55
"Footprints in the Sand" (Single Mix) – 3:58

German Premium single
"Better in Time" (Single Mix) – 3:55
"Footprints in the Sand" (Single Mix) – 3:58
"Bleeding Love" (Moto Blanco Remix Radio Edit) – 3:40
"Better in Time" (Video) – 3:58

Sony single; Swiss Maxi single
"Better in Time" (Single Mix) – 3:55
"Footprints in the Sand" (Single Mix) – 3:58
"Bleeding Love" (Moto Blanco Remix Radio Edit) – 3:40

Credits and personnel

"Better in Time"
Leona Lewis – vocals
J. R. Rotem – instruments, musical arranger, writer and producer
Greg Ogan – recorder
Andrea Martin – writer
Vlado Meller – mastering
Serban Ghenea – mixer
Lyndell Fraser – Pro–tools engineer
Tim Roberts – Pro–tools engineer assistant

"You Bring Me Down"
Leona Lewis – vocals, writer
Salaam Remi – bass, piano, drums, writer
Vincent Henry – saxophone, flute, clarinet
Bruce Purse – trumpet, bass trumpet, flugelhorn
Vlado Meller – mastering
Manny Marroquin – mixer
Taj Jackson – vocal producer, writer
Gleyder "Gee" Disla – recorder
Franklin "Esoses" Socorro – recorder

Charts

Weekly charts

Year-end charts

Certifications

Release history

References

Notes

External links
 
 
 

2000s ballads
2007 songs
2008 singles
Charity singles
Leona Lewis songs
Music videos directed by Sophie Muller
Pop ballads
Contemporary R&B ballads
Song recordings produced by J. R. Rotem
Songs written by Andrea Martin (musician)
Songs written by J. R. Rotem
Comic Relief singles
Number-one singles in Scotland
Syco Music singles
J Records singles